is a passenger railway station located in the city of Uwajima, Ehime Prefecture, Japan. It is operated by JR Shikoku and has the station number "U26".

Lines
Only local trains serve the station. Connections with other services are needed to travel further east of Matsuyama on the line.

Layout
The station consists of a side platform serving a single track. There is no station building, only a shelter for waiting passengers. Limited parking is available at the station forecourt. A bike shed is also available.

History
The Uwajima Line and its stations, including Takamitsu, then became part of the Yosan Mainline from that date. At that time, the station was operated by Japanese Government Railways (JGR), later becoming Japanese National Railways (JNR). With the privatization of JNR on 1 April 1987, control of the station passed to JR Shikoku.

Surrounding area
 Japan National Route 56

See also
 List of railway stations in Japan

References

External links
Station timetable
}

Railway stations in Ehime Prefecture
Railway stations in Japan opened in 1941
Uwajima, Ehime